Ayer Hitam is a federal constituency in Batu Pahat District, Johor, Malaysia, that has been represented in the Dewan Rakyat from 1974 to 1986, from 2004 to present.

The federal constituency was created in the 1974 redistribution and is mandated to return a single member to the Dewan Rakyat under the first past the post voting system.

Demographics

History
It was abolished in 1986 when it was redistributed. It was re-created in 2003.

Polling districts 
According to the gazette issued on 31 October 2022, the Ayer Hitam constituency has a total of 27 polling districts.

Representation history

State constituency

Current state assembly members

Local governments

Election results

References

Johor federal constituencies